"Ball and Chain" is a song written by Pete Townshend and performed by the British rock band The Who, appearing as the second track on their 2019 album Who. The song is a re-recording of a Townshend solo song called "Guantanamo", which was released on his 2015 compilation album Truancy: The Very Best of Pete Townshend. The song was the first single released from Who, and it is about the Guantanamo Bay detention camp in Cuba.

The song is a blues rock track led by Townshend's acoustic guitar, and it is sung by lead vocalist Roger Daltrey. The song was debuted at the band's concert at London's Wembley Stadium on 6 July 2019, though at that time its title was "Big Cigars."

References

The Who songs
2019 singles
Songs written by Pete Townshend
Pete Townshend songs
Polydor Records singles
2015 songs
Blues rock songs